Plateau-des-Petites-Roches is a commune in the Isère department in southeastern France. It was established on 1 January 2019 by merger of the former communes of Saint-Hilaire (the seat), Saint-Bernard and Saint-Pancrasse.

See also
Communes of the Isère department

References

Communes of Isère
States and territories established in 2019